Two-step or two step may refer to:

Dance
Two-step (dance move), a dance move used in a wide range of dancing genres
Country-western two-step, also known as the Texas Two-step
Nightclub Two Step, also known as the California Two-step
2-step (breakdance move), an acrobatic maneuver used in breakdancing

Music
 Two Step (song), a single released by the Dave Matthews Band in 1996 
 "2 Step" (song), a single released by DJ Unk in 2007
 "2step" (song), by Ed Sheeran, 2021
 2-step garage, a subgenre of UK garage music
 "2 Step", a bonus track by Destiny's Child from their 2004 album Destiny Fulfilled

Other
Two Step Cliffs
Two-Step (comics)
 Two Step (film), a 2014 American thriller film
Euro step, also known as two-step, a basketball move
Many-banded krait, a species of venomous snake native to Southeast Asia colloquially nicknamed the "two-step snake"